Suhail Abdulla (Arabic:سهيل عبد الله) (born 26 August 1999) is an Emirati footballer. He currently plays as a goalkeeper for Al-Wasl.

Career
Suhail Abdulla started his career at Al-Wasl and is a product of the Al-Wasl's youth system. On 15 May 2015, he made his professional debut for Al-Wasl against Al-Ain in the Pro League.

References

External links
 

1999 births
Living people
Emirati footballers
Al-Wasl F.C. players
Emirates Club players
UAE Pro League players
Association football goalkeepers
Place of birth missing (living people)